Daniel Stamm (born April 20, 1976, in Hamburg), is a German film filmmaker. He is best known for directing the horror films The Last Exorcism (2010), 13 Sins (2014) and Prey for the Devil (2022).

Filmography

Film

Television

References

External links
 

1976 births
Film people from Hamburg
Living people
English-language film directors
Horror film directors